AHC may refer to:

Arts and music
American Head Charge, an American rock band
American Heroes Channel, an American TV network

Medicine
Alternating hemiplegia of childhood, a neurological disorder
Apical hypertrophic cardiomyopathy or Yamaguchi syndrome, a type of thickening of the heart

Organizations
 Aboriginal Housing Company, an Aboriginal organisation in Sydney, Australia
Alabama Historical Commission, a historic preservation agency
Allan Hancock College, a community college in California, US
American Horse Council, a trade organization
Angkor Hospital for Children in Cambodia
Arab Higher Committee, political organisation in Mandate Palestine
Army Hospital Corps, (1857–1884), predecessor of the British Royal Army Medical Corps
Associates of Holy Cross, post-nominal initials
Austin History Center
Australian Heritage Commission, heritage conservation organisation

Other
74AHC-series integrated circuits, a logic family of integrated circuits
Active heave compensation, for offshore equipment
AHC, a diecast toy vehicle company based in the Netherlands; associated with Auto Pilen
Amedee Army Airfield (IATA airport code AHC)